Khichra or Khichda is a variation of the dish Haleem, popular with Muslims of the Indian subcontinent. Khichra is cooked all year and particularly at the Ashura of Muharram. It is made using goat meat, beef, lentils and spices, slowly cooked to a thick paste. It is the meat-based variant of Khichdi, a rice dish from the Indian subcontinent. In Pakistan, beef Haleem and Khichra is sold as street food in most cities throughout the year.

Origin
Khichra and Haleem are very similar dishes; meat is grounded in Haleem while it is left as chunks in Khichra.

The origin of Haleem lies in the popular Arabian dish known as Harees (also written as Jareesh). According to Shoaib Daniyal, writing in The Sunday Guardian, the first written recipe of Harees dates back to the 10th century, when Arab scribe Abu Muhammad al-Muzaffar ibn Sayyar compiled a cookbook of dishes popular with the "kings and caliphs and lords and leaders" of Baghdad. "The version described in his Kitab Al-Tabikh (Book of Recipes), the world’s oldest surviving Arabic cookbook, is strikingly similar to the one people in the Middle East eat to this day" it reported. Harees was introduced to the city by Arab soldiers of the Nizam's army.

As per the Delhi based historian Sohail Hashmi, the Khichra originated as a famine relief measure in the North Indian city of Lucknow while building the Old Imambara of Lucknow. Due to a famine, the then Nawab of Awadh commenced the construction of an Imambargah, announcing that anyone who participated in the construction would be given free food. This free food consisted of rice slowly cooked with mutton and various pulses, thus becoming rich in protein and carbohydrates. This aided a number of famine affected people who would otherwise have died. Once the construction of the Imambargah was completed, the dish continued to get popular and can today be found not just in Lucknow, but a number of cities of the Indian subcontinent. Travellers took this dish to other parts of the Indian subcontinent, where it further acquired a local flavor.

Haleem, Khichra and Khichdi
In the Indian subcontinent, both Haleem and Khichra are made with same ingredients. Haleem is cooked until the meat blends with the lentils, while in Khichra chunks of meat remain as cubes. Khichdi is a vegetarian dish with rice and pulses or lentils.

See also

 Khichdi
 List of Pakistani soups and stews
 List of stews

References

Indian meat dishes
Lentil dishes
Pakistani meat dishes
Pakistani soups and stews